This is a list of diplomatic missions in Paraguay. Currently there are 30 embassies in the capital Asunción. Major cities, namely Ciudad del Este and Encarnación host consular missions. Other countries accredit their embassies in Buenos Aires, Argentina  or Brasília, Brazil, on a non-residential basis to Paraguay.

This listing excludes honorary consulates, trade missions, and cultural institutes.

Diplomatic missions in Asunción

Embassies 

 (Represents Juan Guaidó)

Other missions or delegations 
 (Delegation)
 (Representative office)

Consular missions

Ciudad del Este 
 (Consulate)
 (Consulate General)
 (Consulate General)

Encarnación 
 (Consulate)
 (Vice-consulate)
 (Consular office)

Salto del Guairá 
 (Consulate)

Pedro Juan Caballero 
 (Consulate)

Concepción 
 (Vice-Consulate)

Non-resident embassies accredited to Paraguay 
Resident in Buenos Aires, Argentina

  

  

   

Resident in Brasilia, Brazil

 
 

   
 

 
 
  
  

  
 
 
 

 
 
 
   
  
 
 

Resident in Montevideo, Uruguay

Resident elsewhere

 (Caracas)
 (Washington, DC)
 (Washington, D.C.)
 (Washington, D.C.)

Closed missions

See also
 Foreign relations of Paraguay

References

   List of embassies
   List of consulats

List
Paraguay
Diplomatic missions